Claire Milne is a Scottish curler and curling coach.

She started curling in 1985 at Letham Grange Curling Rink.

Teams

Women's

Mixed

Record as a coach of national teams

Private life
Her sister Mairi Milne (Herd) is a curler too, sisters was longtime teammates.

References

External links

Living people
Scottish female curlers
Scottish curling champions
Scottish curling coaches
Year of birth missing (living people)